Cynthia Uwak  (born 15 July 1986 in Akwa Ibom State) is a Nigerian football striker who most recently played for Åland United in the Naisten Liiga in Finland.

Early life
Cynthia Uwak's first experience of playing football was against boys in the streets of her hometown. She was supported by her mother to pursue football, and was able to combine playing with her secondary education.

Football career

Club
Cynthia Uwak began her club career with Finnish women's side KMF, and has spent the majority of her club career in Scandinavia with the exception of a stint in France and Germany. 
She was part of the Olympique Lyonnais team that won the Division 1 Féminine title in France in 2009. After moving to Finnish side Åland United, she won a further Naisten Liiga title in 2013, and was the top goal scorer in the division.

International
She is also a member of the Nigeria national football team. Uwak competed at the 2008 Summer Olympics and the 2007 FIFA Women's World Cup.

She missed out on the squad for the 2010 African Women's Championship in South Africa following an injury. It was stated at the time by coach Eucharia Uche that this would not automatically mean that she would be left out of the squad for the 2011 FIFA Women's World Cup during the following year. However, when the World Cup squad was announced, Uwak was not listed. No specific reason was given for her omission, with a general statement saying "The coach has strictly gone with players that are capable of doing the country proud at the World Cup in Germany".

She was considered for a return to the national team by coach Florence Omagbemi in 2016 for the Africa Women Cup of Nations in Cameroon. The coach was looking at a succession of former players in an effort to bolster the team's chances at the upcoming tournament.

Personal life
Uwak has previously spoken out against the notion that all women involved in football are lesbians; "saying that female footballers are lesbians is rather pathetic. You can’t just label people based on assumptions."

Honours

Club 
Division 1 Féminine (1): 2009
Naisten Liiga (3): 2011, 2012, 2013

International
African Women's Championship (2): 2004, 2006

Personal 
African Women Footballer of the Year (2): 2006, 2007
Naisten Liiga top scorer (1): 2013

References

External links
 Cynthia Uwak profile Women's League in Finland (Finnish)
 

1986 births
Living people
Nigerian women's footballers
Nigeria women's international footballers
2007 FIFA Women's World Cup players
Footballers at the 2008 Summer Olympics
Olympic footballers of Nigeria
1. FC Saarbrücken (women) players
Olympique Lyonnais Féminin players
Åland United players
FC United (Jakobstad) players
Kansallinen Liiga players
Expatriate women's footballers in Finland
Expatriate women's footballers in France
Expatriate women's footballers in Germany
Expatriate women's footballers in Sweden
PK-35 Vantaa (women) players
Sportspeople from Akwa Ibom State
Women's association football forwards
Division 1 Féminine players
Damallsvenskan players
Frauen-Bundesliga players
African Women's Footballer of the Year winners